Pugachev is a 1937 Soviet drama film directed by Pavel Petrov-Bytov.

Plot 
Don Cossack Pugachev, leader of the Peasant war of 1773–1775 in Russia. Using rumors that the  Emperor Peter III of Russia  was alive, Pugachev called himself him; he was one of several dozen impostors posing as Peter, and the most famous of them.

Cast 
 Konstantin Skorobogatov as Yemelyan Pugachev
  Kasim Mukhutdinov as Salawat Yulayev
  Yakov Malyutin as Volotskoy
 Vladimir Gardin as Secreatary of the Senate
  Matvey Pavlikov as Filimon
  V. Usenko as Ivan Tvorogov
  Yelena Karyakina as Sofya
  Yelena Maksimova as Praskovya
  Vladimir Taskin as Sokolsky
  Ivan Sizov as Chika
  Nina Latonina as Ustiniya
  Vasily Chudakov as Chumakov
  Vladimir Uralsky as Khlopusha

Sae also
 Pugachev's Rebellion

References

External links 

1937 films
1930s Russian-language films
Soviet black-and-white films
1930s historical drama films
Lenfilm films
Soviet historical drama films
1937 drama films